Wael Abdelgawad (born May 2, 1965) is an American-born novelist, web developer and martial artist, best known for founding one of the first online Muslim matchmaking services, and for his fictional portrayals of American Muslims. As a columnist for the multi-author blog MuslimMatters.org, he has published a series of online novels that have garnered popular attention from Muslim readers. His writings are often quoted on social media websites such as Tumblr, Facebook and Twitter.

Wael is the founder of Zawaj.com, an online Muslim matrimonial service. Founded in 1998, it was one of the first such services created, and is the oldest still extant.  Abdelgawad also founded the popular IslamicAnswers.com website, which provides advice to people with marriage and family problems. In 2010, his blog IslamicSunrays.com was nominated for a Brass Crescent award.

Wael is the author of Pieces of a Dream, a novel set in San Francisco and depicting the spiritual journey of a taxi driver and Iraq war veteran named Louis. The novel belongs to the relatively new English-language genre known as Muslim fiction.

Background 
Wael Abdelgawad's parents were both Egyptian-American scientists who immigrated to the USA shortly before he was born. Wael grew up in California, attended junior high school in Libya, and high school in Saudi Arabia. He studied English literature at California State University Fresno as well as Fresno City College. At FCC he was editor of the university literary magazine, Potpourri. He has held jobs including literacy tutor, librarian, San Francisco bicycle messenger, taxi driver, daytrader and web developer. Since 1998 he has been working as a webmaster and writer.

Wael was a resident of the San Francisco Bay Area for many years, then lived in Panama from 2005 to 2008. He now resides in Fresno, California.

Martial arts 
Abdelgawad began his study of martial arts with Shotokan Karate at the age of 14, according to his martial arts biography, and continued his studies with arts such as HwaRangDo, Hapkido, Pekiti-Tirsia Kali, Silat, Shorin-Ryu, Kokodo Jujutsu, Jeet Kune Do and Aikido. He holds multiple black belt ranks. In 2013 he founded his own style, Hammerhead Hapkido, which incorporates techniques from Silat, and focuses on close quarters fighting and transitions from strikes to joint techniques, as well as knife defense.

Appearances 
Abdelgawad was a featured speaker at the annual ICNA-MAS convention held in Baltimore, Maryland in April 2017, where he discussed the use of fiction in normalizing the American view of Islam and Muslims. He also spoke at the Islamic Society of North America's (ISNA) 54th annual convention in Chicago in June 2017.

Personal life 
Abdelgawad has one child, a daughter named Salma, born in 2006.

References 

1965 births
Living people
American writers of Egyptian descent
Islamic fiction writers